Postal is an unincorporated community in Pettis County, Missouri, United States.

History
The community was named for its country post office.  A post office called Postal was established in 1891, and remained in operation until 1904. Postal also contained a schoolhouse, which is now defunct.

References

Unincorporated communities in Pettis County, Missouri
Unincorporated communities in Missouri